Jokinen is a Finnish surname. Notable people with the surname include:

 Seppo Jokinen (born 1949), Finnish writer
 Titta Jokinen (born 1951), Finnish actress
 Esa Jokinen (born 1958), Finnish decathlete
 Antti Jokinen (born 1968), Finnish music video and film director
 Vesa Jokinen (born 1970), Finnish singer 
 Olli Jokinen (born 1978), Finnish hockey player, centre
 Erja Jokinen (born 1979), Finnish ski-orienteering competitor
 Ilona Jokinen (born 1981), Finnish soprano opera singer
 Jussi Jokinen (born 1983), Finnish hockey player, left wing
 Johan Jokinen (born 1990), Danish racing driver

Finnish-language surnames